Michael Henry Warriner (3 December 1908 – 7 April 1986) was an English rower who competed in the 1928 Summer Olympics representing Great Britain.

Warriner was born at Chipping Norton, Oxfordshire.  He was educated at Harrow School and Trinity College, Cambridge, where he rowed with the First Trinity Boat Club and was a member of the Pitt Club.  First Trinity represented Great Britain rowing at the 1928 Summer Olympics in Amsterdam, where, Warriner won an Olympic gold medal in the coxless four with John Lander, Edward Vaughan Bevan and Richard Beesly. They recorded a time of 6:36.0 in the final to beat the U.S. crew by 1 second. He was also in the winning Cambridge boat in Boat Races of 1928, 1929 and 1930. He was President of the C.U.B.C. in his last year. He was in winning crews at Henley Royal Regatta in the Visitors' Challenge Cup in 1928 and the Stewards' Challenge Cup and the Ladies' Challenge Plate in 1929.

In 1930 Warriner went into colonial service with the Sudan Government. He returned to England in 1934 and went into business as an engineer. During World War II he was initially with the Indian Army but then served as a lieutenant colonel in the Royal Engineers in Greece and the Middle East. He was awarded the MBE in 1945. He was Deputy Lieutenant of Warwickshire and an alderman of Warwickshire County Council. In 1972, was chairman of the council.

Warriner died at Shipston-on-Stour, Warwickshire at the age of 77.

See also
 List of Cambridge University Boat Race crews

References

External links
 National Archives – Warriner of Bloxham Grove and Weston Park

1908 births
1986 deaths
People educated at Harrow School
Alumni of Trinity College, Cambridge
English male rowers
Cambridge University Boat Club rowers
Olympic rowers of Great Britain
Rowers at the 1928 Summer Olympics
English Olympic medallists
Olympic gold medallists for Great Britain
Royal Engineers officers
British Army personnel of World War II
People from Chipping Norton
Olympic medalists in rowing
Medalists at the 1928 Summer Olympics
Military personnel from Oxfordshire
Indian Army personnel of World War II
British Indian Army soldiers